Laurel is a city in Cedar County, Nebraska located at the merger of Highway 20 and Highway 15 in the northeast corner of the state. Laurel sits roughly 40 miles east of Norfolk, Nebraska, west of Sioux City, Iowa, and south of Yankton, South Dakota. Wayne State College in Wayne, Nebraska is 15 miles south of Laurel. Its population was 975 at the 2020 census.

History
Laurel was founded in 1893 and was originally named Claremont Junction. The present name is after Laura Martin, the daughter of one of the cities founders.

In 2021 the city completed its last phase of a $2.6 million dollar Downtown Revitalization Project which included removing the median from and pouring new concrete on East 2nd (Main) Street, widening the downtown sidewalks, and constructing a new city hall which houses the city offices, senior center, and can be used for parties and events.

Also in 2021 the city opened its new fire hall in thanks to fundraising and donations. The new fire hall holds up to seven fire engines, two ambulances, and has storage, classroom, a common area spaces. The volunteer fire department and EMS are housed out of the hall.

The city is currently in the initial phase of constructing a new school which will be attached to part of the existing school. Once the new area is complete, the existing structure will receive renovations and updates. This is part of a $25 million dollar bond that passed in 2021 by a single vote, 596-595.

Schools
Laurel is located within the Laurel-Concord-Coleridge School District. Currently the Elementary and High School are based in Laurel. Their mascot is the Bears.

Churches
Laurel is served by five community churches:
 Immanuel Lutheran Church, Lutheran Church-Missouri Synod
 Laurel United Methodist Church, United Methodist Church
 St. Mary's Catholic Church, Catholic Church
 United Lutheran Church, Association of Free Lutheran Congregations
 United Presbyterian Church, Presbyterian Church (USA)

Demographics

2010 census
At the 2010 census, 964 people in 415 households, including 263 families, lived in the city. The racial makeup of the city was 96.8% White, 0.2% African American, 0.2% Native American, 0.3% Asian, 1.2% from other races, and 1.2% from two or more races. Hispanics or Latinos of any race were 2.4%.

Of the 415 households, 26.3% had children under 18 living with them, 56.4% were married couples living together, 5.3% had a female householder with no husband present, 1.7% had a male householder with no wife present, and 36.6% were not families. About 33.5% of households were one person and 16.4% were one person aged 65 or older. The average household size was 2.26, and the average family size was 2.90.

The median age was 44.7 years; 22.6% of residents were under 18; 6.4% were between 18 and 24; 21.3% were from 25 to 44; 25% were from 45 to 64; and 24.7% were 65 or older. The gender makeup of the city was 48.0% male and 52.0% female.

2000 census
At the 2000 census, 986 people in 414 households, including 264 families, were in the city. The population density was 1,072.5 people per square mile (413.8/km). The 466 housing units had an average density of 506.9 per square mile (195.6/km).  The racial makeup of the city was 99.49% White, 0.20% Native American, 0.10% Pacific Islander, 0.10% from other races, and 0.10% from two or more races. Hispanics or Latinos of any race were 0.30%.

Of the 414 households, 26.3% had children under 18 living with them, 56.3% were married couples living together, 6.3% had a female householder with no husband present, and 36.0% were not families. About 32.9% of households were one person, and 22.9% were one person 65 or older. The average household size was 2.28, and the average family size was 2.91.

The age distribution was 23.3% under 18, 6.3% from 18 to 24, 20.4% from 25 to 44, 19.8% from 45 to 64, and 30.2% 65 or older. The median age was 45 years. For every 100 females, there were 85.0 males. For every 100 females 18 and over, there were 79.1 males.

The median household income was $29,722, and for a family was $35,662. Males had a median income of $26,731 versus $20,833 for females. The per capita income for the city was $16,500. About 6.0% of families and 8.4% of the population were below the poverty line, including 10.0% of those under age 18 and 7.2% of those age 65 or over.

Notable people
 James Coburn, actor
 Mark Calcavecchia, professional golfer

External links
 City of Laurel (Official site)
 Laurel-Concord-Coleridge School District

References

1892 establishments in Nebraska
Cities in Cedar County, Nebraska
Cities in Nebraska
Populated places established in 1892